Løkta is an island in the municipality of Dønna in Nordland county, Norway. The  island is located between the islands of Dønna and Hugla, at the entrance to the Ranfjorden. Løkta Church is located on the island. Historically, the western part of the island was a part of the old municipality of Dønnes and the eastern part belonged to the municipality of Nesna, but in 1962 all of the island became a part of Dønna Municipality. In 2017, there were 135 residents of the island.

See also
List of islands of Norway

References

Islands of Nordland
Dønna